The 2000 NCAA Division I Cross Country Championships were the 62nd annual NCAA Men's Division I Cross Country Championship and the 20th annual NCAA Women's Division I Cross Country Championship to determine the team and individual national champions of NCAA Division I men's and women's collegiate cross country running in the United States. In all, four different titles were contested: men's and women's individual and team championships.

Held on November 20, 2000, the combined meet was hosted by Iowa State University in Ames, Iowa.

The men's team championship was won by Arkansas (83 points), the Razorbacks' third consecutive and eleventh overall. The women's team championship was won by Colorado (117 points), the Buffaloes' first.

The two individual champions were, for the men, Keith Kelly (Providence, 30:14.5) and, for the women, Kara Grgas-Wheeler (Colorado, 20:30.5).

Men's title
 Distance: 10,000 meters

Men's Team Result (Top 10)

Men's Individual Result (Top 10)

Women's title
 Distance: 6,000 meters

Women's Team Result (Top 10)

Women's Individual Result (Top 10)

References

NCAA Cross Country Championships
NCAA Division I Cross Country Championships
NCAA Division I Cross Country Championships
NCAA Division I Cross Country Championships
Track and field in Iowa
Ames, Iowa
Iowa State University